The Investment Management Association (IMA), now known as The Investment Association, is a trade association for the UK investment management industry.

History
In 2015, the trade body was renamed "The Investment Association", following the merger between the IMA and the Investment Affairs division of the Association of British Insurers.

The IMA was established in 2002 after a merger of the Association of Unit Trust and Investment Funds (AUTIF) and the Fund Managers Association. AUTIF, before 1993, was itself known as the Unit Trust Association and was established in 1959.

References

External links
 Investment Association website

Trade associations based in the United Kingdom
Finance industry associations
Investment management